The Swedish Golf Tour (SGT) for women, from 2021 synonymous with the Nordic Golf Tour (NGT) and from 2022 branded the Ahlsell Nordic Golf Tour, is a professional golf tour operated in cooperation by the golf federations in Denmark and Norway and Sweden.

The NGT is on the third level of international golf tours, below the Ladies European Tour (LET) and the LET Access Series (LETAS). For 2022 all six scheduled tournaments are included in the LETAS.

The SGT for women was named the Swedish Golf Tour 1986–1990, the Lancome Tour 1991–1994, the Telia Infomedia Golf Tour 1995–1997, the Telia Tour 1998–2008, the SAS Masters Tour 2008–2009, the Nordea Tour 2010–2016 and the Swedish Golf Tour 2017–2020. From 2021, the Swedish Golf Tour was included in and synonymous with the Nordic Golf Tour. For 2022, the tour was, for sponsor reasons, named the Ahlsell Nordic Golf Tour.

The Swedish Golf Tour for men is run by the same organization and is from 2020 named the MoreGolf Mastercard Tour.

History 
At the beginning of 1979, Kärstin Ehrnlund became the first Swedish female tournament professional. The following year, Ehrnlund became the first Swedish winner on an international professional golf tour, when she won on the Ladies European Tour (LET) (at the time named the WPGA Tour) and by this showed the possibility for talented Swedish female golfers to turn playing professionals.

The first professional tournament for women held in Sweden and also the first LET tournament in Sweden, was an invitational tournament named the Volvo International taking place at Albatross Golf Club in Gothenburg in 1980.

At the annual meeting of the Swedish Golf Federation in March 1983, "open golf" was introduced, which meant that, from next year both amateurs and professionals were allowed to enter all domestic competitions, international amateur tournaments excluded. Non-PGA members with a licence, as well as PGA members, were allowed to receive prize money. The new and internationally unique rules, made it possible to transform the traditionally most important amateur tournaments in the country to professional tournaments, attractive to sponsors and players. 

The first Ladies European Tour tournament held in Sweden, took place at Mölle Golf Club in Mölle in 1984 and was named the Höganäs Ladies Open. 

The women's Swedish Golf Tour, designed to help Swedish golfers to reach the standard of play needed to qualify for the LET, was established in 1986, two years after the men's tour in the country. The women's tour consisted the first year of seven tournaments, two of them co-sanctioned with the Ladies' European Tour. Liselotte Neumann was the first Order-of-Merit winner, thanks to second-place finishes in both of the two co-sanctioned events. 

In 1988, a company, Svenska Golftourerna AB, was founded, owned equally by the PGA of Sweden and the Swedish Golf Federation, to organize the two Swedish Golf Tours for men and women. Its first chairperson was Ola Öqvist.

Official Feeder Tour to LET
In 2005, the women's SGT became the first official feeder tour for the LET, with the two leading non-exempt players from the ranking gaining LET cards for the following season, and the remainder of the top ten exempted into the final stage of the LET Qualifying School. In 2012, the tour was replaced as the LET's feeder tour by the newly created LET Access Series.

From 2018, the women's SGT was run by the Swedish Golf Federation.

Nordic Golf Tour
For 2020, in cooperation between the Golf Federations of Sweden, Denmark and Norway, the Ladies' Nordic Golf Tour (NGT) was introduced, with its Order-of merit ranking named Road to Creekhouse Ladies Open, including eight tournaments in three countries, six of them to be counted in the LETAS. This meant that the women's SGT remained, but on the level below the NGT.

However, due to the COVID-19 pandemic the events outside Sweden were cancelled and the remaining Swedish events were removed from the 2020 LET Access Series (LETAS) schedule. Two of the five scheduled tournaments to be held in Sweden went ahead, but with a reduced purse.

From 2021, the Swedish Golf Tour was included in and synonymous with the Nordic Golf Tour.

Sponsorship

Order of Merit (SGT only) winners 

Note: Until 1996, the SGT Order of Merit standings was decided by money won and since 1997 different point systems, not comparable between years, have been in force.

Sources:

See also
List of sporting events in Sweden
Swedish Golf Tour (men)
Swedish PGA Championship (women)

References

External links

 -  in Swedish

Professional golf tours
Golf in Sweden
Women's golf
1986 establishments in Sweden